Protect the Country Temple may refer to these Buddhist temples:

 Huguo Temple (Beijing), in Beijing, China
 Huguo Temple (Panzhou), in Panzhou, Guizhou, China
 Huguo Temple (Wenzhou), in Wenzhou, Zhejiang, China
 Linji Huguo Chan Temple, in Taipei, Taiwan
 Gokoku-ji, in Tokyo, Japan
 Gokoku-ji (Okinawa), in Naha, Okinawa, Japan

See also
 Huguo (disambiguation)
 Gokoku Shrine